Fathi Mohammed Baja, also called Fatih Baja, is a Libyan academic and was a member of the National Transitional Council in charge of political affairs and representing Benghazi. Today he is Libya's Ambassador to Canada.

Baja attended Cairo University, Northeastern University, then Mohammed V University in Morocco, where he earned a PhD in political science at Mohammed V University. He taught at Garyounis University. He wrote the manifesto adopted by leaders to outline the basic goals of the 2011 Libyan civil war: democracy and national unity. Baja represents the city of Benghazi on the National Transitional Council of Libya. He is also the member of the council in charge of political affairs, and as such heads the Political Affairs Advisory Committee. In this role, he has had direct contact with leaders and representatives from the Libya Contact Group. He has stated that council members have studied the De-Ba'athification of Iraq and the aftermath of dissolution of the Soviet Eastern Bloc and wish to avoid similar disorder and purging of policemen and officials in Tripoli and other cities. He has also worked to assure foreign leaders that rivalries will not erupt within the council and that the transition will be democratic.

References

Living people
Members of the National Transitional Council
Libyan democracy activists
Libyan political scientists
People from Benghazi
Cairo University alumni
Northeastern University alumni
Mohammed V University alumni
Ambassadors of Libya to Canada
Year of birth missing (living people)